Biddy Mason (August 15, 1818 – January 15, 1891) was an African-American nurse and a Californian real estate entrepreneur and philanthropist. She was one of the founders of the First African Methodist Episcopal Church in Los Angeles, California. Enslaved upon birth, she developed a variety of skills and developed knowledge of medicine, child care, and livestock care. A California court granted her and her daughters freedom in 1856.

Early life
Biddy Mason was born into slavery reportedly on August 15, 1818, in Hancock County, Georgia, but her exact birthplace and birthdate are unknown.  At an early age, she was taken from her parents and moved to the plantation of another slave owner. Although records during her youth are incomplete, she spent most of her time on a plantation owned by Robert Smithson.

During her teenage years, she learned domestic and agricultural skills. Additionally, she developed skills in herbal medicine and midwifery taught to her by other enslaved women. These skills were passed down from African, Caribbean, and Native American traditions. Her knowledge benefited both the enslaved people and the plantation owners. According to some authors, Biddy was either given to or sold to Robert Mays Smith and his bride Rebecca Dorn Smith in the 1840s. Biddy was valuable to the Smiths because of her knowledge of medicine, child care, and livestock care.

Biddy had three children: Ellen born in about 1838, Ann born in about 1844, and Harriet born in about 1847. The fathers of her children are unknown, but some authors have speculated that Robert M. Smith likely fathered at least one of her children. A 25-year-old enslaved woman named Hannah worked with Biddy on the plantation; like Biddy, Hannah had three of her own children.

Relocations in 1847 and 1851
Missionaries from the Church of Jesus Christ of Latter-day Saints (Mormon) proselytized in Mississippi. They taught Smith, his wife, and six children and they converted in 1847. Enslaved people were only allowed to be preached to and baptized with their owner's permission, according to church policy. It is unknown whether Biddy was baptized.

The Smith household joined a group of other church members from Mississippi to meet the Mormon exodus from Nauvoo, Illinois, in 1847. The group traveled to Pueblo, Colorado, and joined up with the sick detachment from the Mormon Battalion. During the journey west, Biddy herded livestock, prepared meals, and midwifed while caring for her own children. They later joined the main body of Mormons crossing the plains, and arrived in the Salt Lake Valley, Utah Territory in 1848. Thirty-four enslaved people went with their owners to the Utah Territory. The enslaved people built log cabins, cleared fields, and planted in the town of Cottonwood, in the Salt Lake Valley.

 Church leader Brigham Young sent a group of Mormons to Southern California in 1851. Young instructed the group that California was a free state, and their slaves would be free when they arrived in California. Robert Smith, the people he enslaved, and his family settled in San Bernardino, California. Biddy was among a number of enslaved people in the San Bernardino settlement. As part of the Compromise of 1850, California was admitted as a free state. Nevertheless, some migrants from the South, including Robert Smith, continued to bring enslaved people into the state. California's courts routinely ruled against the freedom claims of enslaved African Americans in support of slave owners. Biddy was under the control of the slave owner Robert Smith and ignorant of the laws and her rights.

Freedom
In 1856, Smith decided to move to the slave state of Texas and sell his slaves there. He told his slaves that they would be free in Texas. Biddy relayed her fears of being separated from her children and remaining enslaved to two free black men: Charles Owens and Manuel Pepper. The men, including sheriffs and others, served Smith with a court order. A Los Angeles court heard the habeas corpus action regarding her freedom. Smith claimed that Biddy wanted to go to Texas.  He then bribed her lawyer to not show up. She was not allowed to testify in court, since California law prohibited black people from testifying against white people. After Smith failed to appear in court on January 21, 1856, the judge presiding over the case, Benjamin Ignatius Hayes, freed Biddy and her family members. In 1860, Mason received a certified copy of the document that guaranteed her freedom. Biddy had no legal last name when she was enslaved.

Los Angeles
After becoming free, Mason and her daughters moved in with Robert Owens, the father of Charles Owens and a well-known Los Angeles businessman. Her daughter Ellen would eventually marry Charles Owens. Mason worked in Los Angeles as a nurse and midwife, delivering hundreds of babies during her career. Using her knowledge of herbal remedies, she risked her life to care for those affected by the smallpox epidemic in Los Angeles. One of her employers was the noted physician John Strother Griffin. Saving carefully, she was one of the first African American women to own land in Los Angeles. As a businesswoman, she amassed a relatively large fortune, which she shared generously with charities. Mason also fed and sheltered the poor, and visited prisoners. She was instrumental in founding a traveler's aid center, and a school and day care center for black children, open to any child who had nowhere else to go. Because of her kind and giving spirit, many called her "Auntie Mason" or "Grandma Mason."

In 1872, along with her son-in-law Charles Owens and other Black residents of Los Angeles, Mason was a founding member of First African Methodist Episcopal Church of Los Angeles, the city's first Black church. The organizing meetings were held in her home on Spring Street. She donated the land on which the church was built. She also helped to establish the first elementary school for black children in Los Angeles.

Mason spoke fluent Spanish and was a well-known figure in the city. She dined on occasion at the home of Pio Pico, the last governor of Alta California and a wealthy Los Angeles land owner.

Family 
Mason's daughter Ellen married Charles Owens and had two sons Robert Curry Owens (1859-1932) and Henry Louis Owens (1861-1893). For many decades, Robert Curry Owens was noted as the wealthiest Black man in Los Angeles. Henry L. Owens died in 1893. Later in life, Robert Curry Owens engaged in politics and real estate. He went on to own the Owens Block, a two-story brick building built on Broadway in the early 1890s that became the first Black-owned business building in Downtown Los Angeles.

Legacy 
Mason was fond of saying, 

After Mason's death on January 15, 1891, she was buried in Evergreen Cemetery in the neighborhood of Boyle Heights. On March 27, 1988, in a ceremony attended by the mayor of Los Angeles and members of the church she founded, her burial place was marked with a gravestone.

Mason is an honoree in the California Social Work Hall of Distinction. She was also celebrated on Biddy Mason Day on November 16, 1989. A ceremony at the Broadway Spring Center unveiled a memorial to highlight her achievements.

Biddy Mason Park is near the site of Mason's home. It is a downtown Los Angeles city park and site of an art installation describing her life. Artist Sheila Levrant de Bretteville designed an installation called Biddy Mason's Place: A Passage of Time. It is an  concrete wall with embedded objects that tell the story of Mason's life. 

Mason is featured in a mural by Bernard Zakheim in UC Hall at the University of California, San Francisco. The painting, dating to the 1930s, is currently facing demolition along with the rest of the building as part of a campus upgrade.

See also
 History of the African Americans in Los Angeles
 History of slavery in California
 Mormonism and slavery

Notes and references

External links
 The Long Road to Freedom: Biddy's Remarkable Journey
 A History of Black Americans in California: Biddy Mason
 California Social Work Hall of Distinction: Biddy Mason
 Biography at DistinguishedWomen.com

African-American nurses
American nurses
American women nurses
American midwives
African Americans in the American Old West
Mormonism and race
19th-century American slaves
African Methodist Episcopal Church
19th-century American businesspeople
Businesspeople from Los Angeles
Burials at Evergreen Cemetery, Los Angeles
People of the American Old West
1818 births
1891 deaths
History of slavery in California
 19th-century African-American women
 19th-century American businesswomen
Harold B. Lee Library-related 19th century articles